Willowdale State Forest is a Massachusetts state forest located in the towns of Hamilton, Topsfield, and Boxford.  The area is managed by the Massachusetts Department of Conservation and Recreation. The forest's eastern portion sits on the Ipswich River across from Bradley Palmer State Park.

Activities and amenities
Trails: The forest's  of trails, which include a section of the Bay Circuit Trail, are used for walking, hiking, mountain biking, horseback riding, and cross-country skiing.
Hood Pond: The  pond offers opportunities for canoeing and fishing.
Restricted hunting is available in the portion of the forest west of U.S. Route 1.

References

External links
Willowdale State Forest Department of Conservation and Recreation

State parks of Massachusetts
Massachusetts natural resources
Bay Circuit Trail
Ipswich, Massachusetts
Topsfield, Massachusetts
Boxford, Massachusetts
Parks in Essex County, Massachusetts